Sir Dorabji Tata (27 August 1859 – 3 June 1932) was an Indian businessman of the British Raj, and a key figure in the history and development of the Tata Group. He was knighted in 1910 for his contributions to industry in British India.

Early life and education  

Dorab was the elder son of Hirabai and Parsi Zoroastrian Jamsetji Nusserwanji Tata. Through an aunt, Jerbai Tata, who married a Bombay merchant, Dorabji Saklatvala, he was a cousin of Shapurji Saklatvala who later became a Communist member of the British Parliament.

Tata received his primary education at the Proprietary High School in Bombay (now Mumbai) before travelling to England in 1875, where he was privately tutored. He entered Gonville and Caius College, Cambridge, in 1877, where he remained for two years before returning to Bombay in 1879. He continued his studies at St. Xavier's College, Bombay, where he obtained a degree in 1882.

Upon graduating, Dorab worked for two years as a journalist at the Bombay Gazette. In 1884, he joined the cotton business division of his father's firm. He was first sent to Pondicherry, then a French colony, to determine whether a cotton mill might be profitable there. Thereafter, he was sent to Nagpur, to learn the cotton trade at the Empress Mills which had been founded by his father in 1877.

Marriage

Dorabji's father, Jamshetji, had visited Mysore State in south India on business, and had met Dr. Hormusji Bhabha, a Parsi and the first Indian Inspector-General of Education of that state. While visiting the Bhabha home, he had met and approved of young Meherbai, Bhabha's only daughter. Returning to Bombay, Jamshetji sent Dorab to Mysore State, specifically to call on the Bhabha family. Dorab did so, and duly married Meherbai in 1897. The couple had no children.

Meherbai's brother, Jehangir Bhabha, became a reputed lawyer. He was the father of scientist Homi J. Bhabha. Thus Dorabji was Homi Bhabha's uncle by marriage. The Tata Group funded Bhabha's research and his research institutions, including the Tata Institute of Fundamental Research.

Business career 
Dorabji was intimately involved in the fulfilment of his father's ideas of a modern iron and steel industry, and agreed to the necessity for hydroelectric electricity to power the industry. Dorab is credited with the establishment of the  Tata Steel conglomerate in 1907,  which his father founded and Tata Power in 1911, which are the core of the present-day Tata Group. 

Dorabji accompanied the mineralogists searching for iron fields. It is said that his presence encouraged researchers to search areas that would otherwise have been neglected. Under Dorabji's management, the business that had once included three cotton mills and the Taj Hotel Bombay grew to include India's largest private sector steel company, three electric companies and one of India's leading insurance companies. 

Founder of New India Assurance Co Ltd. in 1919, the largest General Insurance company in India, Dorabji Tata was knighted in January 1910 by Edward VII, becoming Sir Dorabji Tata.

Non-business interest
Dorabji was extremely fond of sports, and was a pioneer in the Indian Olympic movement. As president of the Indian Olympic Association, he financed the Indian contingent to the Paris Olympics in 1924.  The Tata family, like most of India's big businessmen, were Indian nationalists.

Tata was a member of the International Olympic Committee during most of the years between World War I and World War II.

Death

Meherbai Tata died of leukaemia in 1931 at the age of 52. Shortly after her death, Dorabji established the Lady Tata Memorial Trust to advance study of diseases of the blood. 

On 11 March 1932, one year after Meherbai's death and shortly before his own, he established a trust fund which was to be used "without any distinction of place, nationality or creed", for the advancement of learning and research, disaster relief, and other philanthropic purposes. That trust is today known as the Sir Dorabji Tata Trust. Dorabji additionally provided the seed money to fund the setting up of India's premier scientific and engineering research institution, the Indian Institute of Science, Bangalore. 

Dorabji died in Bad Kissingen, Germany, on 3 June 1932, at the age of 73. He is buried alongside his wife Meherbai in Brookwood Cemetery, Woking, England. They had no children.

References

Further reading
 Choksi, R. "Tata, Sir Dorabji Jamshed (1859–1932)" in Oxford Dictionary of National Biography (2004) accessed 28 Jan 2012, a brief scholarly biography.
 Nomura, Chikayoshi. "Selling steel in the 1920s: TISCO in a period of transition," Indian Economic & Social History Review (January/March 2011) 48: pp 83–116, .

External links
 Biography at the Dorabji Tata Trust
 Biography at Tata Central Archives
 Tata family tree

1859 births
1932 deaths
Dorabji
Parsi people from Mumbai
Businesspeople from Mumbai
Burials at Brookwood Cemetery
Alumni of Gonville and Caius College, Cambridge
Knights Bachelor
Indian Knights Bachelor
Indian industrialists
Indian businesspeople in mining
Indian businesspeople in coal
Businesspeople in steel
Indian philanthropists
Founders of Indian schools and colleges
Indian businesspeople in insurance
Indian businesspeople in textiles
Tata Group people
Indian emigrants to Germany
International Olympic Committee members
Parsi people
Indian expatriates in the United Kingdom
Indian sports executives and administrators